Parthenon: Rise of the Aegean is a historical board game.

Gameplay
Parthenon simulates commerce in the Aegean Sea around 600 B.C. 3–6 players begin with control of two villages and a fleet of ships on an island within the Aegean. Each player develops their island through trade, adding villages and structures. A game represents three years of time, and each year is divided into four seasons of ten phases. The winner is the first to complete all structures.

Publication history
The game is published by Siren Bridge Publishing and Z-Man Games, Inc. It was designed by Andrew Parks and Jason Hawkins.

Reception
Parthenon: Rise of the Aegean won "Board Game of the Year" during the 32nd annual Origins Award.

Contents
Components include a game board, 6 reference cards, 18 counters and 440 cards.

References

External links
 

Board games introduced in 2005
Board games about history
Origins Award winners
Z-Man Games games